Astacus or Astakos was a town on the west coast of ancient Acarnania, on a bay, one side of which is formed by the promontory anciently named Crithote. Astacus is said to have been a colony of Cephallenia. At the commencement of the Peloponnesian War, it was governed by a tyrant, named Evarchus, who was deposed by the Athenians in 431 BCE, but was shortly afterwards restored by the Corinthians. It is mentioned as one of the towns of Acarnania in a Greek inscription, the date of which is subsequent to 219 BCE.

Its site is located near the modern Astakos.

References

Populated places in ancient Acarnania
Former populated places in Greece
Cephalonian colonies